Eurata selva is a moth of the subfamily Arctiinae. It was described by Gottlieb August Wilhelm Herrich-Schäffer in 1854. It is found in Argentina.

References

 

Arctiinae
Moths described in 1854